Tamara Melinda Pearman (born December 15, 1973) is an American former soccer player who played as a defender, making nine appearances for the United States women's national team.

Career
Pearman played for the La Cueva Bears in high school, and also participated in track and field. In college, she played for the George Mason Patriots from 1991 to 1994. She helped the team reach the final of the 1993 NCAA Division I Women's Soccer Tournament (where they lost to North Carolina), becoming the first black female player to appear in the championship game of the NCAA tournament. She was an NSCAA Second-Team All-American in 1994, and All-Region player in 1993 to 1994. She was included on the NCAA All-Tournament Team in 1993, as well as the All-CAA selection in 1993 (second team) and 1994 (first team). Pearman received the CAA Commissioner's Academic Award in 1993, and was the CAA Player of the Year in 1994. In total, she scored 41 goals and recorded 13 assists for the Patriots, with her tally of career goals ranked fourth in school history.

Pearman made her international debut for the United States on August 6, 1995, in the 1995 Women's U.S. Cup against Norway, with her scoring the winning golden goal. In total, she made nine appearances for the U.S. and scored the one goal, earning her final cap on May 11, 1997, in a friendly match against England.

In club soccer, Pearman played professionally with OKI FC Winds for four years in Japan after finishing at George Mason. She later played for the Maryland Pride, before being selected by the New York Power in the 2000 WUSA Draft. She played for the Power from 2001 to 2003, scoring 8 goals and recording 4 assists in 56 regular season appearances, along with playing in one postseason game. She later played adult soccer for the Fairfax Herricanes in 2015 and Swanson City FC in 2016, managing the former.

She later worked as an assistant coach for the Georgetown Hoyas women's soccer team from 2004 to 2009. Pearman was included in the CAA Silver Anniversary Women's Soccer Team. She was inducted into the La Cueva High School Athletic Hall of Fame in 2016.

Personal life
Pearman was born in Brooklyn, though she grew up in Albuquerque, New Mexico. She lives in Northern Virginia, and has one daughter.

Career statistics

International

International goals

References

1973 births
Living people
Sportspeople from Brooklyn
Soccer players from New York City
American women's soccer players
American women's soccer coaches
African-American women's soccer players
United States women's international soccer players
American expatriate women's soccer players
American expatriate sportspeople in Japan
Expatriate women's footballers in Japan
Women's association football defenders
La Cueva High School alumni
George Mason Patriots women's soccer players
OKI FC Winds players
New York Power players
Nadeshiko League players
USL W-League (1995–2015) players
Women's United Soccer Association players
21st-century African-American sportspeople
20th-century African-American sportspeople
20th-century African-American women
21st-century African-American women